The Wisconsin State Assembly elections of 2020 were held on Tuesday, November 3, 2020.  All 99 seats in the Wisconsin State Assembly were up for election.  13 incumbent Assembly members have filed papers declaring that they will not run for re-election, including two who announced early vacancies.  Right before this election, 63 Assembly seats were held by Republicans, 34 seats were held by Democrats, and two seats were vacant (both seats were vacated by Democrats).

Predictions

Summary

Close races
Seats where the margin of victory was under 10%:

Candidates

See also
 2020 Wisconsin State Senate election
 2020 Wisconsin elections

References

External links
 Wisconsin Elections Commission

Wisconsin State Assembly
State Assembly
2020